Jakarta Fashion & Food Festival or JFFF is an annual festival held in Jakarta, Indonesia. The month-long festival is organised by the DKI Jakarta Provincial Government through the DKI Jakarta Tourism and Culture Office in collaboration with PT Summarecon Agung Tbk. The event is supported by the Indonesian Ministry of Tourism and Creative Economy and the Indonesian Ministry of Trade. JFFF is also supported by various parties  such as the Martha Tilaar Group, the Indonesian Fashion Entrepreneurs Designer Association (APPMI), the Indonesian Fashion Designers Association (IPMI), Indonesian Cita Weaving (CTI), ESMOD Fashion School, MRA Media Group, Metro TV , Fashion TV, Kompas, and The Jakarta Post. The aim of JFFF is to lift the image, dignity and dignity of the Indonesian people through a culture-based industry. 

JFFF takes place every year in May in the Sentra Kelapa Gading area. JFFF's fashion and culinary themes are embodied in the three main series of events, 
Fashion Extravaganza: A series of fashion shows from local designers and brands, as well as the JFFF Awards
Food festival: hundreds of food stalls/ooths that serve traditional cuisine, starting from meatballs and soto (aromatic soup) to local snacks.
Gading Nite Carnival:  Presenting decorated street floats, entertaining street attractions and attractive lighting techniques.

References

Annual events in Indonesia
Festivals in Indonesia
Fashion events in Indonesia
Tourist attractions in Jakarta
Food and drink festivals in Asia
Recurring events established in 2004
Events in Jakarta